Izhak Weinberg (born 1938) is one of the youngest Holocaust survivors, who lost all his family of 60 souls in a single day. He and his younger brother hid for several years in different villages in Europe and survived. Weinberg built an amazing life full of meaning and art.

For the last 30 years he has been intensively involved in the project of imparting the lessons of the Holocaust to Yad LaYeled, which includes personal testimony and the establishment of commemorative corners, created from his wall hangings, in memory of the 1.5 million children who were murdered in the Holocaust. To date, 42 memorial centers have been set up throughout the country, including 329 hand-woven tapestries, hand-woven in his home, with the assistance of his vision, the theme of which is the anti-thesis of the Holocaust and symbolizes the victory of the spirit over Nazi Germany.

As this is written, Weinberg is aware that he belongs to the waning generation of Holocaust survivors, and must tell what happened, despite all the emotional difficulties. The feedback he receives from all the audiences that he meets with gives him the strength to continue this holy work. For 25 years he has accompanied the trips to Poland as a witness, bringing the youth to the scene of the devastation of his family in Belzec Death Camp.

There is another reference on Belzec Death camp in this link:

He felt there is a great thirst among the youth, to hear first-hand the story of survival, from that terrible time. Only a small handful of survivors, who decided to dedicate their lives, were left to convey the terrible story of the past to the younger generation.

In 2006, Yad Vashem published his book Three Mothers for Two Brothers, which tells of his survival and his brothers during the war. Channel 8 also produced a film called "Day Care in Hell" that focuses on their survival at Bergen-Belsen in Germany.

In 2011, he produced the film "Here I Learned to Love", based on his book, describing his and his brothers' survival in Poland, Hungary, Germany and Switzerland, which was shown on Channel 2 on the eve of Holocaust Remembrance Day in 2012. Since then,

The film has been translated into 5 languages and is screened in all communities around the world.  There is a reference to this movie in a NY Times article.

From 2011 until today, he continues to do a great job of researching the extermination camp at Belzec, where the ashes of his entire family are buried, including archaeological excavations at the site.

He had just finished a film he'd been working on for several years. A special film about Belzec. Called "Polish Tune" (English and Hebrew versions).  For the first time he exposed the method of industrial murder in the gas chambers that was carried out in all three camps of Operation Reinhard – Belzec, Sobibor and Treblinka. Millions of victims were murdered in the factories of moving tape. His entire nuclear family was father, mother, grandfather, grandmother, great-grandmother, and my entire family, 60 people, were all murdered in one day in the camp. He created the 11-minute film so they could easily watch it. The film will serve as a weapon, in the war to deny the Holocaust, and against anti-Semitism. The picture of the six Jewish musicians at the entrance to the gas chambers, the two geraniums on the sides of the stairs, and the copper Star of David above the entrance will be accompanied by all his life.

There is another reference on Izhak Weinberg life and accomplishments in this link

Life 
Izhak Weinberg was born in 1938 in Krakow, Poland to Jewish family. His parents names were Mordechai and Minda Weinberg. In 1941 the family was deported to the Krakow ghetto. In June 1942, there was a large aktion in the ghetto, and the entire family of 60 people was sent to the extermination camp in Belzec. At the same day the whole family was killed in the gas chambers of the camp. Weinberg and his brother Avner were smuggled out of the ghetto by his aunt, Avin's sister Malka, and his uncle Yitzhak to Shatil's house, and for two years they were hidden among the local gentiles.

In February 1944, they were smuggled through Czechoslovakia to Hungary, but only one month later, in March 1944, Nazi Germany entered Budapest and the demonic dance began again.

In June 1944, the aunt who smuggled them to Hungary brought the brothers as hidden passengers to the Kasztner train, assuming that this was a rescue train intended to reach Palestine. Due to short negotiations between Kasztner and Eichmann, the rescue train was transferred to Germany and all its passengers 1684 + the two hidden children, ended in the Bergen-Belsen concentration camp.

As their language was Polish, while the other passengers were Hungarian-speaking, they found themselves again in the heart of hell alone, without any relatives. Weinberg was five and a half years old then, left to care for his younger brother. A 20 year old young woman adopted them in camp for 180 days. Their native language was changed from Polish to Hungarian.

In December 1944, the rest of the surviving group was released and transferred under the agreement between Kasztner and Eichmann to Switzerland. In Switzerland, they are slowly recovering and gradually returning to normal life, but now Naomi, the girl who adopted them and became a loving and devoted mother in the camp, committed suicide.

In September 1945, they were transferred to the port of Bari in Italy and from there sailed on the illegal immigrant ship "Will Duran" to Palestine. As soon as they arrived in Palestine, they were transferred by the British to the Atlit detention camp. They stayed in the camp for several weeks.

On October 11, 1944, The day after the night of the break-in to Atlit, they are transferred to Agudat Israel's Sanhedria institution in Jerusalem, and study in the "cheder" Torah and mitzvot. Here the Hungarian language is replaced by Yiddish. After a few months, as a result of a lack of accommodation, they are smuggled from there and transferred to the Tehiya Bnei Akiva youth center in Petah Tikva for three years. Here, for the fourth time, their language of Yiddish is changed to Hebrew and studied at the Netzach Yisrael boys' school.

In 1949, the Youth Aliyah closed the Tehiya institution and all the children were transferred to Raanana's Kfar Batya youth village. Where he was educated until 1955. In that school he studied with Yaffa Eliach who later married the principal of the school. From there he begins his studies at the Air Force Technical School and continues to serve as a career soldier until 1964, during which he completes his matriculation exams.

Since he did not have a close family, the Air Force base served as his home and in all the breaks, Sabbath and holidays he stayed in the camp. So there was no concern for the lone soldier who had no family, and each one dealt alone with his fate. But precisely because of this he invested all his energy and time in intensive work and professional advancement, and is rewarded with a rapid rise in the professional ranks, which brings him great satisfaction in the military services.

Weinberg always viewed his service in the air force as the most beautiful and fertile period in his life, as the place where the School of Life served. There he also found his partner Ilana.

In 1960. he married Ilana and established a family with her. He had two daughters. Zohar was born in 1967 and served as an infantry instructor, today a doctor in biology. Hila was born in 1969 and served in the Armored Corps in the Golan Heights. And today a teacher at Ma'alot High School. Both are married and have three granddaughters and three grandchildren.

Between the years 1964–1977 he worked as an independent in the automotive spare parts industry.

Since 1977, he studied art for three years at the University of Haifa and for two more years in the Ein Hod artists village, specializing in weaving wool-wall carpets.

In 1981, he was accepted as a member of the National Painters and Sculptors Association and continues to study for another year with teacher Shmuel Bonneh.

In 1987, the "Lapid" movement, led by Aryeh Barnea, initiated a conference of Kasztner train survivors. After a 45-year-old elm, he tells the story of his survival in its entirety, including the escape from the Krakow ghetto, the Kasztner train, Bergen-Belsen, Switzerland, Italy, Atlit, .

Recently Izhak Weinberg started taking Harmonica lessons with Ami Luz from Harmonica Breeze and produced a video that reflects the soul of a Jewish boy who survived the Holocaust and brings a universal message to the world from the Jewish people.  The song is based on the Pslams.

References

1938 births
Kraków Ghetto inmates
Bergen-Belsen concentration camp survivors
Living people
Polish emigrants to Mandatory Palestine
Israeli Air Force personnel